The Hong Kong Senior Challenge Shield, known commonly as the Senior Shield, is the football knockout inter-club competition held in Hong Kong and the fourth oldest football tournament in Asia. Traditionally, only teams that play in the Hong Kong Premier League take part in the competition. However, sometimes teams in the lower divisions, usually the champions of the Junior Shield, are invited in order to increase the number of participating teams.

The current Senior Shield holders are Kitchee.

History

Hong Kong Football Cup was a knockout cup competition which was established in 1895. It had been renamed to Hong Kong Challenge Shield due to the changes of the trophy. It had been divided in Senior Shield and Junior Shield since 1922–23 season. The knockout format has been used except in 1982–83 and 1996–97 seasons. In 1982–83, group matches format was used. In 1996-1997, a double knock-out system were used. Before 1978, a re-match would be played after a draw. After 1978, extra time and penalty kicks were used. Penalty shoot-out has been used for 3 times in the final in history (1988, 1994, 1995). But starting from 2011, Hong Kong Challenge Shield is a two-legged home-and-away ties competition.

Lee Kin Wo is the player who has won the most number of Senior Shield. He won it for 10 times between 1987 and 2005. (Eastern: 1987, 1993, 1994; South China: 1996, 1997, 1999, 2000, 2002, 2003; Sun Hei: 2005). Ho Ying Fan and Wu Kwok Hung have won the competition for 9 times.

There are 3 teams after World War II which won Senior Shield immediately after their promotions to First Division League. They are Rangers (1966), Jardine (1969) and Seiko (1973).

In 1987–1988, it was the first time to have external sponsor for the competition. Camel Paints sponsored the competition for 6 consecutive years. In 1993–1994, the sponsor was Emperor Financial Services Group. In 2003–2004 and 2004–2005, Sunray Cave was the sponsor and the most recent sponsor is Choi Fung Hong.

One of the most unexpected results in the competition history is a 6–5 win by Army against Happy Valley in 1965.  At the time, Army was at the bottom of the First Division League and had to relegate to the Second Division next season while Happy Valley was the league Champion.

Trivia 
In 1981–82, Eastern invited English football legend Bobby Moore to play in the final. The 40-year-old famous player played for 12 minutes only in the match, which Eastern beat Rangers by 4–0.

Finals

Key

Results

Notes

Results by team
Teams shown in italics are no longer in existence in Hong Kong football league system.

See also
The Hong Kong Football Association
Hong Kong First Division League
Hong Kong Premier League

References

External links
HKFA website
Hong Kong Football
RSSSF.com Hong Kong - List of Senior Shield Finalists

 
Football competitions in Hong Kong
Shield
1895 establishments in Hong Kong
Recurring sporting events established in 1895